Rhododendron pachysanthum, the thick-flowered rhododendron, is a species of flowering plant in the heath family Ericaceae, that is native to Taiwan. This species is particularly noted for its  leaves, which may be heavily felted on both surfaces, red above and brown beneath. In early spring, trusses of pale pink flowers appear, spotted crimson on the inner surface.

In cultivation in the UK Rhododendron pachysanthum has gained the Royal Horticultural Society’s Award of Garden Merit. It is hardy down to  but like most rhododendrons it requires a sheltered spot in dappled shade, and an acid soil enriched with leaf mould.

Synonyms
Rhododendron pseudochrysanthum Hayata 
Rhododendron f. rufovelutinum T. Yamazaki
Rhododendron pseudochrysanthum var. rufovelutinum (T. Yamazaki) T. Yamazaki
Rhododendron rufum Batalin var. pachysanthum (Hayata) S. S. Ying.

References 

pachysanthum